Ludwig Wijnants (born 4 July 1956, in Veerle) was a Belgian professional road bicycle racer.

Major results

1979
Harelbeke - Poperinge - Harelbeke
Zwijndrecht
1980
Putte-Mechelen
1981
Budingen
GP Frans Verbeeck
Ronde van Limburg
1982
Omloop Leiedal
1983
Booischot
1984
Ninove
1985
Tour de France:
Winner stage 7
Herselt
1986
Herk-de-Stad
Houtem
Onze-Lieve-Vrouw Waver
1987
Putte-Mechelen
1991
Grand Prix Adri van der Poel

External links 

Belgian male cyclists
1956 births
Living people
Belgian Tour de France stage winners
Sportspeople from Antwerp Province
People from Laakdal